Devinder Toor is a Canadian politician who was elected in the 2019 Alberta general election to represent the electoral district of Calgary-Falconridge in the 30th Alberta Legislature.

Electoral history

2019 general election

2016 by-election

2015 general election

References

Living people
Businesspeople from Calgary
Politicians from Calgary
Canadian politicians of Indian descent
United Conservative Party MLAs
21st-century Canadian politicians
Year of birth missing (living people)